The Pike: Gabriele d'Annunzio, Poet, Seducer and Preacher of War is a 2013 book by the writer Lucy Hughes-Hallett first published in London by Fourth Estate. The American edition, published by Knopf in 2013, is titled Gabriele d'Annunzio: Poet, Seducer, and Preacher of War. The book is a biography of Gabriele d'Annunzio, although it is written in a style more commonly seen in fiction, which echoes that of d'Annunzio's autobiography. Finding mere chronology insufficient for telling the story of her "extraordinary, unstoppable and in many ways quite ridiculous" subject, Hughes-Hallett "tries out a variety of cross-sections and settings, mosaics and micro-narratives," as Robert Gordon wrote in Literary Review.

It won the Samuel Johnson Prize, the Duff Cooper Prize, and the Costa Book Award for Biography.

Reviews
 The Economist book review
 The Financial Times book review
 The Guardian book review
 The Independent book review
 New York Times book review
 The Observer book review
 The Telegraph book review
 Times Higher Education book review

References

2013 non-fiction books
Gabriele D'Annunzio
Fourth Estate books
British biographies